Machine Intelligence may refer to:
 Artificial intelligence, intelligence exhibited by machines
 Machine learning, giving computers the ability to learn without being explicitly programmed